The 1999 International Rules Series was the sixth annual International Rules Series and the second time that a test series of international rules football has been played between Ireland and Australia since the series resumed in 1998.

The 1999 series was played in Australia with a two-test series used to decide the winner. The first test was played at the Melbourne Cricket Ground and the second test was played at Football Park in Adelaide. The 1999 Series was historic for the fact that a then record crowd of 64,326 turned up at the Melbourne Cricket Ground for the first test followed by a strong 45,187 fans at the second test in Adelaide. The two combined crowds equalled to 109,513, smashing the opening record at the previous year's series in Ireland.

The second test of the 1999 series in Adelaide finished as a draw, the first time such a result occurred in an international rules series.

Series overview 
The first test was played at the Melbourne Cricket Ground in front of a then record crowd of 64,326. In a high scoring game, the Irish were victorious with McDermott scoring Ireland's only goal of the match. The Australians were not disgraced, finishing just 8 points behind the Irish at the end of the night with Nathan Buckley kicking 5 overs. The second test provided a unique result. In a first for any international rules game, the second test finished as a draw. Despite this, the Irish still won the series by 8 points on aggregate (their winning margin of the first test). Nathan Buckley again scored 5 overs, prompting many to pronounce him the Jim Stynes Medal winner. Michael O'Loughlin and Shane Crawford each scored a goal each whilst for the Irish, McDermott and Tohill gained scores of 7 in front of over 45,000 people at Football Park in Adelaide. Ireland won the series 122–114 on aggregate.

Squads 
For Australian squad see: Australia 1999 Team
For Ireland squad see: Ireland 1999 Team

Matches

First test

Second test

See also 
 International Rules football
 Gaelic football
 Australian rules football
 Comparison of Australian rules football and Gaelic football

References 
 https://web.archive.org/web/20141006072553/http://footystats.freeservers.com/Footystats/Aust-Ireland.html#1999
 http://internationalrules.gaa.ie/1999.html (Archived 2009-06-11)
 http://www.tariksport.com/international%20rules%20results.shtml (Archived 2009-06-11)

1999
International sports competitions hosted by Australia
International Rules Series
1999 in Australian rules football